"Must Have Done Something Right" is the lead single from Relient K's fifth album, Five Score and Seven Years Ago. The song was officially released to radio in January 2007, along with the music video, which was shot in December 2006 and released on February 6, 2007. The song was released to iTunes on November 28. The single comes with a bonus song, "(Hope for Every) Fallen Man".The song is downloadable for Rock Band 3.

The song's length is 3:07 on the single, but 3:19 in the video and on the album. This is because the song's ending is extended for the album and the video so that it goes another chorus and into a fade out at the end, as opposed to the abrupt ending for the single.

Music video
The video (directed by Marc Webb) is primarily focused on Matt Thiessen's efforts to reclaim a soccer ball his girlfriend (Jonna Walsh) kicks near the beginning of the song.  During sporadic shots, the band (with Thiessen) plays (alternately) in a bowling alley and in front of a lake.  The friendly pop rock, and guitar-laced rhythms smooth the quick shots and transitions between scenes and locations as the camera follows the flight of the ball. Thiessen challenges a tamales vendor, a police officer, a little girl, a library student, and a construction worker, among others, to get the ball and the girl's attention. The song's ending is slightly extended, and ends in a fadeout instead of the single's abrupt stop after the last chorus. As of January 28, 2013, the music video has over 3.2 million views on YouTube.

Track listing
"Must Have Done Something Right" (Radio Edit) 3:07
"Fallen Man" 3:47

Alternate version
"Must Have Done Something Right" (Radio Edit) 3:07
"Fallen Man" 3:47
Must Have Done Something Right (Album Version) 3:19

References

External links

2006 singles
Relient K songs
Songs written by Matt Thiessen
Music videos directed by Marc Webb
Song recordings produced by Howard Benson
2006 songs
Capitol Records singles
Gotee Records singles